Ak-Chin Regional Airport  (previously "Phoenix Regional Airport") is a privately owned  public-use airport located  south east of the CBD of Phoenix, in Pinal County, Arizona, United States.

Facilities and aircraft 
It has one runway: 
4/22 measuring 4,751 x 50 feet (1,448 x 15 m) with an asphalt surface. 

The runway was repaired, resealed, and painted in January 2019.

For the 12-month period ending April 21, 2017, the airport had 31,682 aircraft operations, an average of 2640 per month. At that time there were 10 aircraft based at this airport: 9 single-engine and 1 multi-engine.

References

External links 

Airports in Pinal County, Arizona